Ben Garrett may refer to:

 Ben Garrett, of the American worship band Zealand Worship
 Ben Garrett, English art pop musician, known as Fryars